The Independent Party of the Right was a political party in Luxembourg led by Eugène Hoffmann, a dissident from the Party of the Right.

History
In the 1925 elections the party received 2.4% of the vote, winning a single seat. It did not contest the partial elections of 1928, and by the 1931 elections Hoffmann had established the Party of Farmers and the Middle Class.

References

Defunct political parties in Luxembourg
Conservative parties in Luxembourg